NGC 1460 is a barred lenticular galaxy in the constellation Eridanus. It was discovered by John Herschel on November 28, 1837.  It is moving away from the Milky Way at 1341 km/s.

Distance and size 
At a distance of nearly 63 million light-years, it is a member of Fornax Cluster. Its size on the night sky is 1.4' x 1.0' which is proportional to its real size of 30,000 light-years, which makes it one of the smaller galaxies in Fornax Cluster.

Characteristics 
NGC 1460 has a Hubble classification of SB0, which indicates it is a barred lenticular galaxy. But, this one contains a huge bar at its core. The bar spreads from the center to the edge of the galaxy, as seen on the Hubble image in the box. This bar is one of the largest seen in barred lenticular galaxies.

NGC 1460 is also an early-type galaxy. Despite their name, early-type galaxies are much older than spiral galaxies, and mostly comprise old, red-colored stars. Very little star formation occurs in these galaxies; the lack of star formation in elliptical galaxies appears to start at the center and then slowly propagates outward. This galaxy is early-type lenticular, but lenticular galaxies have as same process as elliptical galaxies.

References

External links 
 

Barred lenticular galaxies
Astronomical objects discovered in 1837
Fornax Cluster
Eridanus (constellation)
1460
13805